Kirathakudu is a 1986 Telugu-language crime film, based on the novel written by Yandamuri Veerendranath. It was directed by A. Kodandarami Reddy. The film stars Chiranjeevi, Suhasini, Silk Smitha and Jaggayya. S. V. Krishna Reddy plays an unusual role of a eunuch and later made many movies as a director.

This story is based on an idea that, by 1995–2000, the number of criminals in the country would drastically increase and the government could not maintain the prisons. It demarcates some of the areas as crime zones and builds a protection around them. 

Some of the scenes were heavily inspired and even lifted off, from the American film, Escape From New York.

Plot 
Chiru plays a rather unusual role: He hates his father to the core and does not support him even when he is being destroyed. Chakravarthy, who is a CBI officer, who is nominated to the Interpol and his son Charan (Chiranjeevi) is a reputed sportsman, but there is no love between them. Charan spends his life with friends and alcohol to overcome his loneliness.

Dharmateja (Gummadi) is an honest police officer. His daughter Swetha (Suhasini), who is doing research in criminology gets acquainted with Charan. Swetha falls in love with Charan during this process and changes Charan into a caring person.

Chakravarthy is trying to eliminate the notorious criminal gang led by Snake (Kannada Prabhakar).

Meanwhile, Snake and his men, who are enemies of Chakravarti, try every possible method to destroy him and falsely incriminate him in a murder case. Police are after Chakravarti and Charan doesn't care about helping his father out.

In the end, Chakravarthy is kidnapped by Snake, but Charan, with help from Swetha rescues him and hands Snake over to the police.

Cast 
 Chiranjeevi as Charan
 Suhasini as Swetha
 Jaggayya as Chakravarthy
 Allu Ramalingaiah
 Nutan Prasad
 Kannada Prabhakar as Snake
 Silk Smitha as Hamsa
 Gummadi as Dharmateja
 Annapoorna
 Manik Irani
 Chalapathi Rao
Prithvi

Soundtrack 
All songs composed by Maestro Ilaiyaraaja

External links 

1986 films
Films directed by A. Kodandarami Reddy
Films scored by Ilaiyaraaja
1980s Telugu-language films